Muaid Ellafi (Arabic: مؤيَّد اللافي; born 7 March 1996) is a Libyan professional footballer who plays as a winger for Wydad AC.

Club career

USM Alger 
On 15 December 2018, Muaid Ellafi joined USM Alger for two and a half years, after his contract was previously terminated with the Saudi Club Al-Shabab., he told the media that he had received several offers from Egyptian, Moroccan, Tunisian and even Algerian clubs, but he chose USM Alger because It's a big club and has great fans and he aspires to win titles with him, He was assigned the number 10 shirt. Ellafi made his debut for USM Alger in the Ligue 1 against DRB Tadjenanet as a substitute for his injured Oualid Ardji in 1–0 Loss. On 15 January 2019, Ellafi Once again he entered as a substitute in the 67th minute for Mohamed Benyahia in the Derby against NA Hussein Dey, and only needed three minutes to score his first goal and the last in the game from a Direct free kick in 4–1 victory. Ellafi said after the end of the game that he was happy with this win and also his first goal and said my start was successful especially as I return to competition after four months and he will work to be better in the future. On 26 January 2019, and after four games as a substitute he made his debut as a starter in the Ligue 1 against JS Saoura in 2–0 victory. He left the field in the 67th minute because he was not ready to play for 90 minutes. On 26 May 2019, In the last game against CS Constantine, Ellafi he made two assist for Abderrahmane Meziane and Prince Ibara respectively to help them win 3–1 and also achieving his first title with USM Alger.

Before the start of the new season Ellafi return to training until late July in the USM Alger's trainees in Tunisia to end the controversy over his survival because of the club's financial crisis, later he told the Algerian media that he could leave the club easily as a foreign player because he had not received his salary for five months, but he said his love for this club made him decide to stay. On 25 August 2019, Ellafi scored his first goals in the CAF Champions League against AS Sonidep in 3–1 home victory.

International career
Ellafi made his international debut for Libya in 2014 In a friendly match against Morocco. On 6 June 2015, in a friendly match against Mali, he scored his first international goals in 2–2 draw. In August during a 2018 African Nations Championship qualifiers against Algeria he scored twice to lead his country to qualify for the tournament.

Career statistics

Club

International 
Scores and results list Libya's goal tally first, score column indicates score after each Ellafi goal.

Honours 
Al Ahli Tripoli
 Libyan Premier League: 2016

USM Alger
 Algerian Ligue Professionnelle 1: 2018–19

Wydad
 Moroccan Botola Pro: 2020–21
CAF Champions League: 2021-22

References 

1996 births
Living people
People from Zliten
Libyan footballers
Libyan expatriate footballers
Algerian Ligue Professionnelle 1 players
Expatriate footballers in Algeria
C.D. Santa Clara players
USM Alger players
Al-Ahli SC (Tripoli) players
Al-Shabab FC (Riyadh) players
Wydad AC players
Libya international footballers
Saudi Professional League players
Botola players
Association football wingers
Association football inside forwards
Libya youth international footballers
Libyan expatriate sportspeople in Portugal
Libyan expatriate sportspeople in Saudi Arabia
Libyan expatriate sportspeople in Algeria
Expatriate footballers in Portugal
Expatriate footballers in Saudi Arabia
Libyan Premier League players